The 2011 Mosconi Cup, the 18th edition of the annual nine-ball pool competition between teams representing Europe and the United States, took place 8–11 December 2011 at the MGM Grand in Las Vegas, Nevada.

Team Europe won the Mosconi Cup by defeating Team USA 11–7.


Teams

 1 Born outside the United States.

Results

Thursday, 8 December

Friday, 9 December

Saturday, 10 December

Sunday, 11 December

References

External links
 Official homepage

2011
2011 in cue sports
2011 in sports in Nevada
Sports competitions in Las Vegas
December 2011 sports events in the United States
MGM Grand Las Vegas